Queen Margaret’s School is a Canadian school in Duncan, British Columbia, in the Cowichan Valley on Vancouver Island. It has some 345 students in its preschool and kindergarten, junior school and senior school divisions. It also teaches riding and English as a second language.

Alumni 

 Susanna Blunt, artist
 Hon. Ione Christensen, senator
 Charles Ferguson Hoey, Victoria Cross recipient

Affiliations 
 Canadian Association of Independent Schools
 National Association of Independent Schools

References 

Boarding schools in British Columbia
Educational institutions established in 1921
High schools in British Columbia
Private schools in British Columbia
Preparatory schools in British Columbia
Duncan, British Columbia
1921 establishments in Canada